Babilon  is a village in the administrative district of Gmina Lipsko, within Lipsko County, Masovian Voivodeship, in east-central Poland.

The village has an approximate population of 200.

References

Babilon